Jagadish Chandra Barma Basunia is an Indian politician from AITC. In May 2021, he was elected as the member of the West Bengal Legislative Assembly from Sitai.

Career
Barma Basunia is from Sitai, Cooch Behar district. His father's name is Kalipada Barma Basunia. He passed BA from North Bengal University in 1983 and B.P.Ed. from Amaravati University in 1988. He contested in 2021 West Bengal Legislative Assembly election from Sitai Vidhan Sabha and won the seat on 2 May 2021.

References

Living people
Year of birth missing (living people)
21st-century Indian politicians
People from Cooch Behar district
Trinamool Congress politicians from West Bengal
Trinamool Congress politicians
West Bengal MLAs 2021–2026